涼粉 may refer to:
Grass jelly, a jelly-like dessert eaten in East Asia
Liangfen, a Chinese dish that consists of starch jelly
Platostoma palustre, a plant species used in making grass jelly